Suits is a South Korean television series starring Jang Dong-gun and Park Hyung-sik. The drama is based on the American television series of the same name by Aaron Korsh. It aired on KBS2 starting April 25, 2018 on Wednesdays and Thursdays at 22:00 (KST) for 16 episodes.

Synopsis
A capable and distinguished lawyer of the law firm "Kang & Ham" Choi Kang-Seok recruits a young man named Go Yeon-Woo who has a retentive memory but not a law degree. An adaptation from the American TV show Suits.

Cast

Main
Jang Dong-gun as Choi Kang-Seok
A legendary lawyer. He is the equivalent of Harvey Specter, portrayed by Gabriel Macht.
Park Hyung-sik as Go Yeon-woo
A genius rookie lawyer with an excellent memory. He is the equivalent of Michael Ross, portrayed by Patrick J. Adams.
 Chae Jung-an as Hong Da-ham
Choi Kang-seok's capable assistant. She is the equivalent of Donna Paulsen, portrayed by Sarah Rafferty. 
Jin Hee-kyung as Kang Ha-yeon: Co-founder of “Kang&Ham”. She is the equivalent of Jessica Pearson, portrayed by Gina Torres.
Ko Sung-hee as Kim Ji-na
A paralegal who is perfect in what she does. She is the equivalent of Rachel Zane, portrayed by Meghan Markle.
Choi Gwi-hwa as Chae Geun-sik: A lawyer and Kang-Seok's rival. He is the equivalent of Louis Litt, portrayed by Rick Hoffman.

Supporting
Hwang Tae-gwang as Lawyer Huang 
Choi Yu-hwa as Jae-hee
Choi Kang-Seok's informant who collects information and complete missions in secret for him. 
Lee Si-won as Se-hee 
Lee Tae-sun as Seo Gi-woong 
Son Yeo-eun as Kim Moon-hee
Ye Soo-jung as Yoon-woo's grandmother
Jang In-sub as Jang Seok-hyun
Lee Jung-hyuk as Kim Jin-kyu	
Jang Yoo-sang as Park Joon-gyu	
Kim Young-ho as Ham Ki-taek

Special appearance
 Im Kang-sung as Prosecutor
 Lee Yi-kyung as Park Joon-pyo (ep 1–2)
 Bewhy as himself (ep 3–4)
 Jang Shin-young as Na Joo-hee (ep 3–4)
Kang-seok's ex-girlfriend
Kwon Hyuk as Nam Sang-moo
Son Sook as Madame Bae (ep 4)
Son Suk-ku as David Kim (ep 5–6, 13, 15)
Nam Gi-ae as CEO Sim Young Joo (Namyoung CEO)
Jeon No-min as Oh Byung-wook (ep 7)

Production
The remake was first announced in 2015, with the rights being sold to Korea's EnterMedia Pictures Co. Ltd. 
Suits is the second Korean drama co-produced by NBCUniversal after Moon Lovers: Scarlet Heart Ryeo and the third series overall after Saturday Night Live Korea. 
This is Jang Dong-gun's first small-screen comeback in six years.

Original soundtrack

Part 1

Part 2

Part 3

Part 4

Part 5

Part 6

Part 7

Part 8

Ratings
In the tables below, the blue numbers represent the lowest ratings and the red numbers represent the highest ratings.

Awards and nominations

In popular culture
In episode 23 of Marry Me Now, one of the characters is seen watching episode 8 of this drama series.

References

External links
  
 
 
 

Suits (American TV series)
2018 South Korean television series debuts
2018 South Korean television series endings
Korean Broadcasting System television dramas
South Korean legal television series
South Korean television series based on American television series
Television series by Universal Television
Television series by Monster Union